Las Mestas Sports Complex is a multipurpose sports complex in Gijón, Asturias (Spain), used mainly as an equestrian facility for show jumping. It is also used as a velodrome, with its 428 m long track, and as a rugby and American football stadium.

It was inaugurated in 1942 and renovated in 2005. Las Mestas has a capacity of 10,000 people, 3,000 of them seated.

History

Inaugurated in 1942, in its origins Las Mestas was exclusively used for equestrian competitions. On 27 August 1964, a stand collapsed injuring 27 people.

The stadium was several times renovated, the last one in 2005 with an addition of a new covered stand with 2,200 seats.

Uses
CSI Gijón, Spain's Official Show Jumping Horse Show, part of the FEI Nations Cup Promotional League.
Home field of the Gijon Mariners (American football).
Velodrome.
Concerts.

Sporting events
1993 European Show Jumping Championships.
1999 Samsung Nations Cup World Final.
2006 LNFA Bowl
2007 Copa del Rey de Rugby final.
2008 Inline speed skating World Cup.
2011 ITU Duathlon World Championships
2018 LNFA Bowl

International rugby union games held

References

External links
 Profile at Gijón City Hall website
 The velodromo at Gijón City Hall website

Gijón
Rugby union stadiums in Spain
Sports venues in Asturias
Show jumping venues
Velodromes in Spain
Horse racing venues in Spain
American football venues in Spain
1942 establishments in Spain
Sports venues completed in 1942